The Annals of Fontenelle (Annales Fontanellenses, Chronicon Fontanellense) or Chronicle of Saint-Wandrille (Chronicon sancti Wandregesili) is a short history compiled at the Abbey of Saint-Wandrille between 840 and 856. It is in annalistic form and its primarily concerns are local.

The Annales are an important source for the raid of the Viking chiefs Sidroc and Bjørn in 856–58, and also for King Charles the Bald's war with Nominoe, the duke of Brittany. Ferdinand Lot found the Annales to be generally unreliable with dates and dated their composition to after 872.

Notes

Norman chronicles
9th-century Latin books